Justice Booth

James Booth Jr. (1789–1855), associate justice of the Delaware Supreme Court
James Booth Sr. (1753–1828), chief justice of the Delaware Supreme Court
Robert Booth (judge) (1626–1681), Lord Chief Justice of the King's Bench for Ireland

See also
Judge Booth (disambiguation)